Rahel Tschopp (born 30 May 2000) is a Swiss footballer who plays as a midfielder and has appeared for the Switzerland national team.

Career

Club 
Tschopp joined FC Sachseln when he was just nine years old. In August 2014 she moved to FC Luzern.  At FC Sachseln as well as at FC Luzern, she trained and played with boys. Tschopp has been part of the women's team in FC Luzern's National League A since 2016.

National Team 
In July 2018, Tschopp played with the Swiss U19 national team at the U19 European Championships at home in Switzerland. She made her debut in the senior team of Switzerland in the World Cup qualifier for the 2019 World Cup in France on November 9, 2018.

References

External links
 
 
 

2000 births
Living people
Swiss women's footballers
Switzerland women's international footballers
Women's association football midfielders
21st-century Swiss women